Peter Dellavedova (born 1961) is an Australian former professional tennis player.

Active on the professional tour in the 1980s, Dellavedova had a best singles ranking of 482. His career included a men's doubles main draw appearance at the 1980 Wimbledon Championships, where he also featured in singles qualifying and had a win over Jan Gunnarsson. He is a relative of basketballer Matthew Dellavedova, as a first cousin of Matthew's father. His son, also named Matthew, is a professional tennis player.

References

External links
 
 

1961 births
Living people
Australian male tennis players
20th-century Australian people
21st-century Australian people